Anna Magdalena is a given name, based on Anna and  Magdalena (or Magdalene sometimes in German).

Anna Magdalene von Hanau, a countess
Anna Magdalena Bach (1701–1760), second wife of Johann Sebastian Bach
Anna Magdalene Godiche, a Danish publisher

Feminine given names